Majority report may refer to:

 A Majority opinion, in judicial decisions which are not unanimous
 Majority report (Poor Law)
 Majority Report, American feminist newspaper
 The Majority Report with Sam Seder, a US radio show, hosted by Sam Seder, formerly hosted by Janeane Garofalo